"Good Ole Boys Like Me" is a song written by Bob McDill, and recorded by American country music artist Don Williams.  It was released in March 1980 as the second single from the album Portrait.  The song reached number 2 on the Billboard Hot Country Singles & Tracks chart.

Numerous other music artists have also performed this song, including Joe Nichols and Volume Five.

Charts

Weekly charts

Year-end charts

References

1980 singles
Don Williams songs
Songs written by Bob McDill
Song recordings produced by Garth Fundis
MCA Records singles
1980 songs